Variéty is the seventh and last studio album by Les Rita Mitsouko. An English-language version of the album was produced for the international English speaking market under the modified title of Variety. The French-language version reached No. 5 on the French Albums chart, while the English recording peaked at #163.

Track listing

Variéty (French version)

Variety (English version)

References

2007 albums
Les Rita Mitsouko albums
Albums produced by Mark Plati
Because Music albums